Darra Pezu is a town and union council of Lakki Marwat District in Khyber Pakhtunkhwa province of Pakistan. It is located at 32°19'22N 70°44'4E.

Darra Pezu is home to Sheikh Badin, a famous hill station and tourist resort. The Sheikh Badin National Park is also located here.

References

Union councils of Lakki Marwat District
Populated places in Lakki Marwat District